"The Reason Is You" is a 1994 song by German singer and actress Nina Gerhard. She used to sing on several singles by German Eurodance music project Captain Hollywood Project, like "More and More" and "Only with You", before she went solo in 1994 with her frontname 'Nina'. Written by Nosie Katzmann, it was released as the first single from her debut album, Dare! (1995), and was also released with spanish vocals. The single peaked at number one in Belgium and was also a huge hit in Spain, where it reached number two. Additionally, it peaked within the top 20 in Denmark and Iceland. There were made two different music video for the song.

Chart performance
The single enjoyed some success in Europe, peaking at number-one in Belgium. In Denmark, it reached the top 20, peaking at number 20 in January 1995. In Iceland, it was even more successful, peaking at number 16 in February. On the Eurochart Hot 100, "The Reason Is You" reached its highest position as number 11. It did not chart in the UK. 

In Spain, the song reached its second highest chart position in Europe, as number two. It entered the Spanish singles chart at number eight, and the following weeks it climbed to number four, three, and four again, before peaking at number two. Then it dropped to number five, seven, and nine, before leaving the chart. Some weeks later it re-appeared at number 18 and also at number 19, with some weeks in between. It was held off reaching number-one by Ororo's cover version of "Zombie" by The Cranberries.

Track listing
 CD maxi, Germany
"The Reason Is You" (Radio Version) – 4:00
"The Reason Is You" (Tranceformer Extended Mix) – 6:10
"The Reason Is You" (House Mix) – 5:15
"The Reason Is You" (Extended Radio Edit) – 6:30
"Save My Life" – 3:15

 CD maxi, Europe
"The Reason Is You" (Tranceformer Radio Mix) – 3:35
"The Reason Is You" (Spanish Version) – 4:10
"The Reason Is You" (Tranceformer Extended Mix) – 6:10
"The Reason Is You" (Alex' Mix) – 6:20
"The Reason Is You" (Extended Radio Edit) – 6:30

Charts

Weekly charts

Year-end charts

References

External links
 Official Website
 Nina on The Eurodance Encyclopaedia

1994 debut singles
1994 songs
Blow Up singles
English-language German songs
Nina (German singer) songs
Number-one singles in Belgium
Songs written by Nosie Katzmann